There are three villages named Lubyanka in Kyiv Oblast, Ukraine.

They are:

 Lubianka, Bila Tserkva Raion, Kyiv Oblast
 Lubianka, Bucha Raion, Kyiv Oblast
 Lubianka, Vasylkiv Raion, Kyiv Oblast